Jherson Vergara Amú (born 26 May 1994) is a Colombian professional footballer who plays as a centre back.

Career

Early career
A youth product of Boca Juniors de Cali, an amateur team, he signed his first official professional contract in 2011 with Deportes Quindío. Eventually, he was loaned to Universitario Popayán.

Milan
In May 2013, Vergara signed for Italian side AC Milan, for a fee of £1.760.000.

Although unofficial, Vergara played his first match with Milan in the 2013 Audi Cup against Manchester City. A game which Milan lost 3–5. During the pre-season, Vegara dislocated his shoulder and was reported to be out for a month. In late November 2013, it was reported that Vergara would go on loan during the January transfer.

Loan at Parma
In January 2014, Vergara was sent to Italian Serie A side Parma for the rest of the 2013–14 season.

Loan at Avellino
For the 2014–15 season, Vergara was loaned out to Avellino. He scored a goal in a win against Latina.

Loan at Livorno
For the 2015–16 season, Vergara was loaned out to Livorno.

Returning to Milan
After his stint at Livorno, Milan gave Vergara another chance during the 2016 summer pre-season.

Loan to Arsenal Tula
On 31 August 2016, he moved on loan to the Russian Premier League team FC Arsenal Tula for the 2016–17 season.

Back to Milan
For 2017–18 season, Vergara went back to Milan, but got frozen out of the squad. For the entire season, he just trained for the first team with other outcast like Hachim Mastour, Nnamdi Oduamadi and Juan Mauri.

Cagliari

Loan to Olbia
On 17 August 2018, Cagliari announced the signing of Vergara and that he will be sent on loan to Serie C club Olbia for the 2018–19 season. On 31 January 2019 Olbia terminated the loan prematurely after he made only three appearances in the first half of the season.

Return to Olbia
He returned to Olbia on 9 June 2020 until the end of the 2019–20 season. The regular Serie C season was never resumed due to COVID-19 pandemic in Italy, Vergara remained on the bench in two relegation play-off games that Olbia played, and he left the club once again.

Vibonese
On 10 March 2021, he joined Serie C club Vibonese. On 27 January 2022, his contract with Vibonese was terminated by mutual consent.

International career

Youth
Vergara was called up to represent the U20 side for Colombia during the 2013 South American Youth Championship. He scored a goal in the tournament against Paraguayin the last match of the second stage. Eventually, he won the championship with Colombia and received attention from many European clubs. Most noticeably, Italian giants A.C. Milan.

Vergara took part in the Colombian squad that finished runner-up in the 2013 Toulon Tournament. He scored two goals, both being equalizers against the United States and France. Colombia would end up winning both games.

Career statistics

Honours

National team
Colombia
South American Youth Championship: 2013

References

External links

1994 births
Living people
Sportspeople from Valle del Cauca Department
Colombian footballers
Association football defenders
Colombia youth international footballers
Deportes Quindío footballers
Universitario Popayán footballers
A.C. Milan players
Parma Calcio 1913 players
U.S. Avellino 1912 players
U.S. Livorno 1915 players
FC Arsenal Tula players
Olbia Calcio 1905 players
U.S. Vibonese Calcio players
Categoría Primera B players
Serie B players
Serie C players
Russian Premier League players
Colombian expatriate footballers
Colombian expatriate sportspeople in Italy
Expatriate footballers in Italy
Expatriate footballers in Russia
Colombia under-20 international footballers